Schurter Holding AG is a Swiss multinational manufacturer of electrical and electronic components and a provider of electronic services which is based in Lucerne, Switzerland.

The group of companies, which is represented in around 60 countries, employs over 2000 employees and generated sales of 289 million Swiss francs in 2018.

History 
The Schurter company was founded in 1933 by Heinrich Schurter as a limited partnership and was converted into a stock corporation in 1949. In 1990 Schurter Holding AG, which still exists today, was founded in Lucerne (Switzerland). Today, Schurter employs around 2000 people in 17 countries worldwide and is managed by third-generation family members: Hans-Rudolf Schurter is Chairman of the Board of Directors of Schurter Holding AG and his brother, the US-based Bruno H. Schurter, is Vice Chairman. Hans-Rudolf Schurter handed over the operational management of the Schurter Group to Ralph Müller in January 2015. For the first time in the company's more than 80 year history, the operational management of Schurter was thus transferred to external family hands. In order to secure its position as a leading innovator and producer of electronic components, the Schurter Group has been significantly expanded in recent years through acquisitions.

Group Companies 
The Schurter Group comprises 21 companies  in 17 countries, of which 13 companies have their own production facilities.

Products 
Schurter is an innovator, producer and supplier of fuses, appliance plugs, circuit breakers, input systems and EMC products. The focus is on components to ensure a safe power supply and easy operation. Schurter also offers services for the electronics industry in the area of printed circuit board assembly from project planning to the manufacture of end products.

Schurter supplies more than 100,000 customers in the fields of industrial electronics, medical technology, data and communication, aerospace, automotive engineering and energy technology. Selected products are developed in close cooperation with the customers.

Schurter is a globally active industrial partner - and thus very close to the market: with headquarters in Europe, America and Asia, with around 60 country representatives and more than 200 distributors, all of whom are established in the top segment of their industry.

See also 
 List of touch-solution manufacturers

References 

Manufacturing companies of Switzerland
Companies based in Lucerne
Swiss companies established in 1933
Electrical components
Manufacturing companies established in 1933
Multinational companies headquartered in Switzerland